Nikola Bartůňková (born 25 February 2006) is a Czech tennis player. Bartůňková has a career-high singles ranking by the Women's Tennis Association (WTA) of 337, achieved on 9 May 2022, and a career-high WTA doubles ranking of 977, achieved on 25 July 2022.

Junior career 
Junior Grand Slam results - Singles:

 Australian Open: –
 French Open: SF (2022)
 Wimbledon: QF (2022)
 US Open: –

Junior Grand Slam results - Doubles:

 Australian Open: –
 French Open: F (2022)
 Wimbledon: SF (2022)
 US Open: –

Career 
In April 2021, at the 2021 İstanbul Cup,  Bartůňková had her first WTA Tour debut attempt. She defeated WTA No. 152, Leonie Küng, in first round of qualifying but then lost to Anastasia Gasanova. She made her main-draw Tour level debut at the same tournament one year later, getting wildcard for the main-draw.

Performance timelines

Singles 
Current after the 2023 Australian Open.

Doubles 
Current after the 2023 Australian Open.

ITF Circuit finals

Singles: 2 (2 runner-ups)

Junior finals

Junior Grand Slam tournament finals

Girls' doubles: 1 (runner-up)

ITF Finals

Singles: 12 (6 titles, 5 runner-ups, 1 not played)

Doubles: 7 (5 titles, 2 runner-ups)

Notes

References

External links
 
 

 
2006 births
Living people
Czech female tennis players
Tennis players from Prague
21st-century Czech women